The Music School: Short Stories is a collection of 20 works of short fiction by John Updike, first appearing individually in The New Yorker. The stories were collected in this volume by Alfred A. Knopf in 1966.

Stories
The stories in the collection are listed chronological order with respect to their appearance in The New Yorker

“In Football Season” (November 10, 1962)

“The Indian” (August 17, 1963)

“Giving Blood” (April 6, 1963)

“A Madman” (December 22, 1962)

“Leaves” (November 14, 1964)

“The Stare” (April 3, 1965)

"Avec La Bebe-Sitter" (January 1, 1966)

"Twin Beds in Rome" (February 8, 1964)

"Four Sides of One Story" (October 9, 1965)

“The Morning” (July 18, 1964)

"At a Bar in Charlotte Amalie" (January 11, 1964)

"The Christian Roommates" (April 4, 1964)

"My Lover Has Dirty Fingernails" (July 17, 1965)

"Harv is Plowing Now" (April 23, 1966)

“The Music School” (December 12, 1964)

“The Rescue” (May 9, 1964)

“The Dark” (October 31, 1964)

“The Bulgarian Poetess” (March 13, 1965)

"The Family Meadow" (July 24, 1965)

“The Hermit” (February 20, 1965)

Reception

Literary critic Charles Thomas Samuels offers this praise for the collection: “The Music School is Updike’s best collection [to date], with superior examples of every sort of story that he writes.”

Theme and Style

Literary critic George W. Hunt remarks upon the nexus of style and theme that characterize the story's in the volume:

The often idyllic world of Updike's youth and the largesse of “unexpected gifts" as portrayed in Updike's Olinger stories are no longer available to the protagonists of The Music School. Now in their adulthood, they struggle to regain a measure of their former optimism through “epiphanic moments” while plagued by “romantic discord” and “a sense of perplexity.” Abandoning the rural settings of Olinger (a literary creation of Updike's hometown in Shillington, Pennsylvania), The Music School tales take place in suburban Tarbox, “the fictional equivalent of Ipswich, Massachusetts.”

Literary critic Robert M. Luscher notes: “divorce becomes the volume’s dominant metaphor, with separations occurring from spouses, youth, the society, and life itself.” In terms of technique, Updike exhibits a broad versatility of style in his depictions of irretrievable youth: Standard linear narrative (“The Rescue"), meditative mode (“Leaves"), historical sketch (“The Indian") ala  Hawthorne, and epistolary (“Four Sides of One Story”).

Footnotes

Sources 
Hunt, George W. 1979. Reality, Imagination and Art: The Significance of John Updike’s “Best” Story in Critical Essays on John Updike. 1982. pp. 207–216. William R. Macnaughton, editor. G. K. Hall & Co., Boston, Massasschuts. 
Luscher, Robert M. 1993. John Updike: A Study of the Short Fiction. Twayne Publishers, New York. 
Samuels, Charles Thomas. 1966. The Music School: A Place of Resonance from The Nation, October 3, 1966  in John Updike: A Collection of Critical Essays. 1979. David Thorburn and[Howard Eiland editors. pp. 192–195. 

1966 short story collections
Short story collections by John Updike